Yövesi (literally "night water") is a sub-lake of the lake Saimaa in eastern Finland. It is located in Mikkeli municipality in the Southern Savonia region. Part of the Saimaa lake system, it borders on the system of Pihlajavesi to the east. The deepest point of the whole Saimaa is in Yövesi, in Käenniemenselkä open area. The Astuvansalmi rock paintings are situated in the northern shore of Yövesi. 

The critically endangered fish Arctic char lives in Yövesi. Fishing of Arctic char is totally prohibited.

References

Saimaa
Lakes of Mikkeli